Camp+King is a San Francisco-based advertising agency launched in February 2011 as part of Havas Worldwide. Havas is the seventh largest agency holding company in the world. The founders of Camp+King are creative Roger Camp and strategist Jamie King.

History
King founded the agency with former Publicis' Hal Riney partner Roger Camp. Most recently, King was the president of Euro RSCG Chicago, the largest advertising agency for the past five years by number of global accounts. Both King and Camp have spent their careers in advertising at various agencies, including Fallon, Wieden + Kennedy, Cliff Freeman & Partners and Leo Burnett. They met at Publicis Groupe's Publicis & Hal Riney in San Francisco, where King served as CEO.

Clients
The agency was launched with an initial roster of clients that include Old Navy, Yahoo! and Shaklee. Camp+King has positioned itself as creating "Conversation-Swell" for brands. Camp+King recently helped Old Navy build a “full communications plan using in-store, viral, mobile, social and some of their direct channels," for the Halloween season. They are also working with Shaklee Corp., as well as on a project with Yahoo scheduled for a spring 2011 launch.

References

External links
Official Website
SMM Panel Site
Instagram SMM

Havas
Advertising agencies of the United States
Marketing companies established in 2011
Companies based in San Francisco
2011 establishments in California